Wawbeek-Horace A.J. Upham House is located in Wisconsin Dells, Wisconsin.

History
Horace Upham was a prominent Milwaukee-based lawyer and the son of Don A. J. Upham, a member of the legislature of the Wisconsin Territory and Mayor of Milwaukee. Horace and his wife, Catherine, had the house built as their summer home. In 1938, the Uphams donated the property to Wisconsin Easter Seals, which now uses it as Camp Wawbeek, for children with disabilities.

It was listed on the National Register of Historic Places in 1985 and on the State Register of Historic Places in 1989.

References

Houses on the National Register of Historic Places in Wisconsin
National Register of Historic Places in Columbia County, Wisconsin
Houses in Columbia County, Wisconsin
Shingle Style architecture in Wisconsin
Sandstone houses in the United States
Houses completed in 1899